"Gucci Time" is a song by American rapper Gucci Mane, featuring vocals and production from Swizz Beatz.<ref>New Music: Gucci Mane f/ Swizz Beatz – ‘Gucci Time’ Rap-Up.com</ref> The song premiered on Gucci Mane's official MySpace page on August 6, 2010 and was released on August 30, 2010 as the lead single from Gucci Mane's seventh studio album The Appeal: Georgia's Most Wanted''. The song samples French electronic music duo Justice's song "Phantom Pt. II".

Music video 
The music video was released on September 4, 2010 on Myspace. The Chris Robinson-directed clip shows Gucci Mane and Swizz Beatz perform throughout various location of Los Angeles, CA, varying from city streets to a location above to city's skyline, to a club.

Charts

References

2010 singles
2010 songs
Gucci Mane songs
Swizz Beatz songs
Songs written by Gucci Mane
Songs written by Swizz Beatz
Song recordings produced by Swizz Beatz
Music videos directed by Chris Robinson (director)
Song recordings produced by Vinylz